Assitenzarzt (short: AArzt or AA) was a military rank in the Austrian-Hungary Common Army until 1918 and in German Reichswehr and Wehrmacht until 1945.

It describes a qualified or licensed surgeon or dentist comparable to 2nd lieutenant (de: Leutnant) or sub-lieutenant (de: Leutant zur See) NATO-Rangcode OF1b in anglophone armed forces.

Germany

Wehrmacht
In the German Wehrmacht from 1933 until 1945 there were the OF1b-ranks Assitenzarzt (physician), Assitenzapotheker (pharmacologist), and Assitenzveterinär (veterinary), comparable to the Leutnant/Second lieutenant OF1b-rank.

During wartime, the regular assignment of Assitenzarzt was the management of a battalion dressing station (de. Truppenverbandsplatz), supported by help surgeons (de: Hilfsärzte). However, a battalion dressing station could be managed by an Oberarzt (OF1a) as well.

In line to the so-called Reichsbesoldungsordnung (en: Reich's salary order), appendixes to the Salary law of the German Empire (de: Besoldungsgesetz des Deutschen Reiches) of 1927 (changes 1937 – 1940), the comparative ranks were as follows: C 8/C 9

Oberleutnant, Leutnant (Heer and Luftwaffe)
Leutnant
Oberleutnant zur See (Kriegsmarine)
Leutnant zur See
Oberarzt (medical service of the Wehrmacht)
Assistenzarzt
Marineoberassistenzarzt, introduced June 26, 1935 (medical service of the Kriegsmarine)
Marineassistenzarzt
Oberveterinär (veterinarian service of the Wehrmacht)
Veterinär

The piping on shoulder straps shows the Waffenfarbe (en: corps- or troop-function colour), corresponding to the appropriate military service, branch, or special force. The corps colour of the Military Health System in German armed forces was traditional , and of the veterinarian service . This tradition was continued by the medical service corps in Heer and Luftwaffe of the Reichswehr and Wehrmacht.

Address
The manner of formal addressing of military surgeons/dentists with the rank Assitenzarzt was, "Herr Assitenzarzt"; with the rank "Marineassistenzarzt" - "Herr Marineassisgtenzarzt".

Austria-Hungary
In the Austria-Hungarian Common Army (de: Gemeinsame Armee or k.u.k. Armee) there were the OF1b-ranks Assitenzarzt and Assitenztierarz until 1918. That particular ranks were comparable to the Leutnant/2nd lieutenant OF1b-rank as well.

References

Military ranks of Germany
Military ranks of Austria